Régis dos Santos Silva (born 20 November 1989), simply known as Régis, is a Brazilian professional footballer playing for Clube Esportivo Aimoré in Brazil as a midfielder.

Career
In January 2014, Régis moved on a season-long loan deal to J1 League side Nagoya Grampus.

Club statistics
Statistics accurate as of match played 6 December 2014

1Includes Emperor's Cup.
2Includes J.League Cup.
3Includes AFC Champions League.

References

External links
 

1989 births
Living people
Association football midfielders
Brazilian footballers
Brazilian expatriate footballers
Fortaleza Esporte Clube players
Ceará Sporting Club players
Atlético Clube Goianiense players
Nagoya Grampus players
C.S. Marítimo players
Mogi Mirim Esporte Clube players
Sociedade Esportiva e Recreativa Caxias do Sul players
Esporte Clube São Luiz players
Clube Esportivo Aimoré players
Campeonato Brasileiro Série B players
Campeonato Brasileiro Série C players
Campeonato Brasileiro Série D players
J1 League players
Brazilian expatriate sportspeople in Japan
Brazilian expatriate sportspeople in Portugal
Expatriate footballers in Japan
Expatriate footballers in Portugal
Footballers from São Paulo